Stone Road Mall is a shopping mall in Guelph, Ontario, Canada, situated at Stone Road West and Edinburgh Road. It is operated by Primaris Management Inc., and its anchors are Marshalls, Sport Chek, and Chapters-Indigo following the closure of the third anchor tenant, Sears. The area of the former Sears Canada was demolished and became an expansion of the mall in late 2019. Toys "R" Us, HomeSense and Mark's now occupy that location since October 20, 2020.

History
Stone Road Mall first opened in 1975 with a Kmart, Miracle Food Mart, and 35 other stores. In 1978 it doubled to 70 stores, including Sears. The shopping centre  finished an expansion and remodelling of the western section of the mall. There is an ongoing expansion and remodelling of the eastern area of the mall.

The Sears store closed in January 2018 due to its bankruptcy and liquidation.

References

External links

Official site
Primaris REIT
Expansion Construction News

Shopping malls in Ontario
Shopping malls established in 1975
Buildings and structures in Guelph
Tourist attractions in Guelph
1975 establishments in Ontario